Dolichos is a genus of flowering plants in the legume family, Fabaceae, and the subfamily Faboideae. It is distributed in Africa and Asia.

Description
These are herbs and shrubs growing upright, sometimes with climbing stems, or spreading prostrate upon the ground. They have woody rhizomes. The leaves have single blades or are pinnate, divided into three leaflets. The plants sometimes produce their leaves after flowering. The flowers are solitary or in racemes with more than one flower. The flowers are white or purple, or occasionally yellow. The fruit is a flattened legume pod.

The plants' general form, annual stems sprouting from a large perennial rootstock, is thought to be adapted to habitat prone to seasonal wildfire.

Some of the species grow to heights of 30 feet.  The average Dolichos is between 5 and 10 feet high.

Species
There are about 60 species.

Species include:

Dolichos aciphyllus  
Dolichos angustifolius
Dolichos angustissimus  
Dolichos antunesii 
Dolichos argyros  
Dolichos axilliflorus  
Dolichos bellus
Dolichos bianoensis
Dolichos brevidentatus  
Dolichos capensis
Dolichos cardiophyllus 
Dolichos complanatus  
Dolichos compressus  
Dolichos corymbosus  
Dolichos decumbens  
Dolichos dinklagei 
Dolichos dongaluta
Dolichos elatus
Dolichos falciformis  
Dolichos fangitsa
Dolichos filifoliolus
Dolichos formosanus  
Dolichos fragrans
Dolichos glabratus  
Dolichos glabrescens 
Dolichos grandistipulatus  
Dolichos gululu
Dolichos hastiformis  
Dolichos homblei 
Dolichos ichthyophone 
Dolichos junghuhnianus 
Dolichos karaviaensis
Dolichos katali
Dolichos kilimandscharicus Taub.
Dolichos linearifolius
Dolichos linearis
Dolichos longipes
Dolichos lualabensis  
Dolichos luticola  
Dolichos magnificus  
Dolichos mendoncae
Dolichos minutiflorus  
Dolichos nimbaensis  
Dolichos oliveri Schweinf.
Dolichos peglerae
Dolichos petiolatus
Dolichos pratensis  
Dolichos pseudocajanus
Dolichos pseudocomplanatus  
Dolichos quarrei  
Dolichos reptans
Dolichos rhombifolius  
Dolichos schweinfurthii
Dolichos sericeus
Dolichos sericophyllus 
Dolichos serpens
Dolichos simplicifolius 
Dolichos smilacinus
Dolichos splendens
Dolichos staintonii  
Dolichos subcapitatus
Dolichos tenuicaulis 
Dolichos thorelii
Dolichos tonkouiensis  
Dolichos trilobus
Dolichos trinervatus Baker
Dolichos ungoniensis
Dolichos xiphophyllus
Dolichos zovuanyi

References

Phaseoleae
Fabaceae genera
Taxa named by Carl Linnaeus